National Pingtung University of Education (NPUE) was an institution of higher learning in Pingtung City, Pingtung County, Taiwan. It has now become part of National Pingtung University.

Academics
There were 14 departments at the university, including Elementary Education, Educational Psychology and Counseling, Early Childhood Education, Special Education, Mathematics Education, Physical Education, Natural Science Education, Physics and Geoscience, Computer Science, Language and Literature Education, Social Studies Education, Music Education, Visual Arts Education, English Education, Taiwan Cultural Industries Management.

Address
The National Pingtung University of Education was located in southern Taiwan at No. 4-18 Ming Shen Road, Pingtung, Taiwan (Republic of China).  It has since merged with another institution and is now National Pingtung University.

Notable alumni
 Chen Tao-ming, member of Legislative Yuan (2001–2004)
 Lin Chun-te, member of Legislative Yuan (1999–2008)
 Uliw Qaljupayare, member of Legislative Yuan (2008–2020)
 Wu Tse-yuan, Magistrate of Pingtung County (1993–1997)

Transportation
The university is accessible within walking distance East from the Pingtung Station of the Taiwan Railways Administration.

See also
 List of universities in Taiwan

External links

 
2005 establishments in Taiwan